The Royal Netherlands East Indies Army Air Force (ML-KNIL) was the air arm of the Royal Netherlands East Indies Army in the Dutch East Indies (now Indonesia) from 1939 until 1950. It was an entirely separate organisation from the Royal Netherlands Air Force.

The unit was founded in 1915 as the "Test Flight Service". In 1921, it became the "Aviation Service", before finally receiving the designation of ML-KNIL on 30 March 1939. In 1950, following Dutch recognition of Indonesian independence, its bases and facilities were handed over to the Indonesian Air Force (TNI-AU).

World War II

On 1 January 1942, the Dutch forces joined the American-British-Dutch-Australian Command, but at the onset of the Japanese assault the ML-KNIL was not up to full combat strength. Of the aircraft that had been ordered, only a small number had been delivered, and many were obsolete models. There were five groups, three of bombers and two of fighters, each of three to four squadrons. A sixth depot group provided support, transport and training. Reconnaissance aircraft were placed directly under command of the Army to give support to ground troops.

Despite stubborn resistance the Japanese occupied the Dutch colonies, though numbers of aircraft found their way to northern Australia to continue the fight.

Four Dutch squadrons were formed in Australia. The first of these, No. 18 (NEI) Squadron RAAF, was formed in April 1942 as a medium bomber squadron equipped with B-25 Mitchell aircraft. The second joint Australian-NEI squadron, No. 119 (NEI) Squadron RAAF, was also to be a medium bomber squadron. No. 119 NEI Squadron was only active between September and December 1943 when it was disbanded to form No. 120 (NEI) Squadron RAAF, was a fighter squadron. In 1944, the KNIL formed No. 1 Netherlands East Indies Transport Squadron, later absorbed by the RAAF as No. 19 (NEI) Squadron RAAF. Both No. 18 and No. 120 Squadrons saw action against the Japanese during World War II.

From late 1945, numbers 18, 19 and 120 squadrons fought against Indonesian nationalists, during the Indonesian National Revolution. The squadrons were disbanded in 1950.

Aircraft

1915–1918
 Deperdussin-Léon de Brouckère Monoplane (never flown)
 Farman F.22
 Léon de Brouckère No.1 & No.2 (type reconnaissance & trainer, Farman copies)
 Glenn L. Martin Model TT
 Glenn L. Martin Model TA
 Glenn L. Martin Model TE
 Glenn L. Martin Model R

1919–1935

 Avro 504K
 Curtiss P-6E Hawk
 De Havilland DH-9
 Fokker C.IV
 Fokker C.V (D/E)
 Fokker C.X
 Fokker DC.1
 Fokker D.VII
 Fokker F.VIIb-3m
 Fokker S.IV
 Morane-Saulnier AR / MS.35
 NVI F.K.31
 Pander D
 Vickers Viking

1936–1950

 Brewster B-339C/D (export Brewster Buffalo)
 Bücker Bü 131 Jungmann
 Commonwealth CA-6 Wackett
 Consolidated Model 28-5MN
 Consolidated Model 28-5AMN
 Curtiss P-40E/N Kittyhawk
 Curtiss Model 75A-7 (export P-36 Hawk)
 Curtiss-Wright CW-21B
 Curtiss-Wright CW-22 Falcon
 Douglas C-47 Dakota
 Dornier Do 24K
 Douglas C-54 Skymaster
 Douglas DC-3
 Fairchild F-24R-9
 Glenn Martin 139/166 (export B-10)
 Hawker Hurricane IIb
 Mitsubishi Ki-57 "Topsy"
 Koolhoven F.K.51
 Lockheed 212
 Lockheed 12
 Lockheed Model 18 Lodestar
 Lockheed C60 Lodestar
 Messerschmitt Bf 108B-1
 North American P-51 MustangD/K)
 Noorduyn Norseman
 North American AT-16 Harvard
 North American B-25 MitchellC/D/J
 Piper J-4E
 Piper L-4J
 Ryan STM-2 
 Taylorcraft L-2 Grasshopper
 Tiger Moth
 Waco EGC-7
 Waco UKC

Commanders
 1915 Captain C.E. Visscher
 1917 Captain C.L. Vogelesang
 1919 Captain C. van Houten
 1921 Captain J.A. Roukes
 1924 Captain P.F. Hoeksema de Groot
 1927 Major J. Beumer
 1928 Lieutenant-Colonel J.H. Wesseling
 1932 Major G.A. Ilgen
 1934 Major-General L.H. van Oyen
 1945 Major-General E.T. Kengen
 1946 Colonel P.J. de Broekert
 1948 Major-General C.W. van der Eem

See also
 Royal Netherlands East Indies Army
 Hein ter Poorten
 Jacob van Helsdingen
 Albert Eduard Stoové
 August Deibel
 Gerard Bruggink
 Netherlands East Indies campaign
 Jan Hilgers
 Free Dutch Forces

Notes

References

External links

 
  
 
 
 

Royal Netherlands East Indies Army Air Force
Military units and formations established in 1915
Royal Netherlands East Indies Air Force
Military history of Indonesia
Military history of the Netherlands
Dutch East Indies
Army aviation units and formations
Disbanded air forces
Military units and formations disestablished in 1950